Naepan station is a signal box on the Gyeongbu Line in Yeondong-myeon, Sejong City, South Korea.

Railway stations in Sejong